The Sobański, plural: Sobańscy, feminine form: Sobańska is a Polish noble family. The family originated from Masovia, taking their name from the village Sobania and Sobanice in the land of Wyszogród and Ciechanów. Connected with the families Bieliński, Łubieński, Jełowicki, Borukowski and Gostkowski.

History

In the 15th century the Sobański family split into two lines: the "Ciechanowska" (older line) and "Wyszogrodzka" (younger line), the latter one used the nickname Ścibor. One branch of the Ścibor-Sobański settled in Pomerania, another one in Volhynia and Podolia. In 1880 Feliks Sobański from Podolia, founder of the "Masovian line" of the family, received the hereditary title of Count from Pope Leo XIII.

Notable family members

 Antoni Sobański
 Feliks Sobański
 Jarosław Marek Sobański
 Małgorzata Sobańska	
 Remigiusz Sobański	
 Stanisław Sobański
 Teodor Sobański

Coat of arms
The Sobański family used the Junosza coat of arms.

Palaces

References

Bibliography

 Maria z Grocholskich Hieronimowa Sobańska: "Wspominki nikłe". Grodzisk Mazowiecki, Primum 2002
 Polski Słownik Biograficzny, tom XXXIX, Instytut Historii PAN, Warszawa-Kraków 1999–2000 
 "Drzewo Genealogiczne 64 herbowe po mieczu i kądzieli Sobańskich, Jałowieckich, Drohojowskich wydane w 200 numerowanych egzemplarzach jako rękopis, w Warszawie, Nakładem Rodziny", 8.02.1912

External links
 http://www.cbr.edu.pl/rme-archiwum/2005/rme8/stronki/2.html